Finongan is one of the Finisterre languages of Papua New Guinea.

References

Finisterre languages
Languages of Morobe Province